Hera Hyesang Park is a South Korean soprano.

Career 

During the 2017–2018 season, she made her opera debuts at the Bavarian State Opera and Metropolitan Opera.

In May 2020, she signed with Deutsche Grammophon.

Personal 

She resides in New York City.

Awards 
 2016 Gerda Lissner Foundation International Competition, First Prize
 2015 Montreal International Musical Competition, Second Prize
 2015 Operalia, Second Prize

References

External links 
  (in English)

Year of birth missing (living people)
Living people
South Korean operatic sopranos
21st-century South Korean women singers
21st-century South Korean singers